The Boathouse is the tenth album by Celtic band Gaelic Storm.  It was released on August 20, 2013.  The name of the album refers to a boathouse in Annapolis, Maryland, where the tracks were recorded.  It spent two weeks at #1 on the Billboard World Album chart.

Track listing 
 "Yarmouth Town" - 4:35
 "Girls of Dublin Town" - 3:00
 "Liverpool Judies" - 3:45
 "My Son John" - 3:30
 "Down to Old Maui" - 4:35
 "Mingulay Boat Song" - 5:00
 "Cape Cod Girls" - 3:26
 "Weary Whaling Grounds" - 3:09
 "Essequibo River" - 3:51
 "Watery Grave" (Steve Twigger) - 4:15
 "Whiskey Johnny" - 2:41
 "William Hollander" - 4:39

All are arrangements of traditional songs, except Watery Grave.

References 

Gaelic Storm albums
2013 albums